The following outline is provided as an overview of and topical guide to Kohima:

Kohima – second-largest city in the Indian state of Nagaland. Originally known as Kewhira, Kohima was founded in 1878 when the British Empire established its headquarters of the then Naga Hills District of Assam Province. It officially became the capital after the state of Nagaland was inaugurated in 1963. Kohima was the site of one of the bloodiest battles of World War II. The battle is often referred to as the ‘Stalingrad of the East’. In 2013, the British National Army Museum voted the Battle of Kohima to be ‘Britain's Greatest Battle’.

General reference 
 Pronunciation: 
 Common English name(s): Kohima
 Official English name(s): City of Kohima
 Nicknames of Kohima:
 Adjectival(s): 
 Demonym(s):

Geography of Kohima 

Geography of Kohima
 Kohima is: a city
 Population of Kohima: 
 Area of Kohima:  
 Atlas of Kohima

Location of Kohima 
 Kohima is situated within the following regions:
 Northern Hemisphere
 Eastern Hemisphere
 Eurasia
 Asia
 South Asia
 India
 Northeast India
 Nagaland
 Kohima District
 Time zone(s): Indian Standard Time (UTC+5:30)

Environment of Kohima 

 Climate of Kohima

Landforms of Kohima 

 Pulie Badze

Areas of Kohima

Wards of Kohima 

Municipal Wards of Kohima

The specific wards are listed below.

Neighborhoods in Kohima 

 Neighborhoods in Kohima

Locations in Kohima

Parks and zoos in Kohima 
 Sakhrie Park

Historic locations in Kohima 
 Kohima War Cemetery

Other

Demographics of Kohima

Government and politics of Kohima 

 Kohima Municipal Council

Nagaland government within Kohima 

Kohima is the capital of Nagaland, and its branches of government located there are:
 Raj Bhavan, Kohima

History of Kohima 

History of Kohima

History of Kohima, by period

History of Kohima, by subject 
 Battle of Kohima
 1986 Killing of Kekuojalie Sachü and Vikhozo Yhoshü
 1995 Kohima massacre

Culture in Kohima 
Culture of Kohima
 Architecture of Kohima
 Kohima Capital Cultural Center
 Regional Centre of Excellence for Music & Performing Arts

Art in Kohima

Cinema of Kohima

Music of Kohima

Religion in Kohima 

 Christianity in Kohima
 Churches in Kohima
 Kohima Ao Baptist Church
 Kohima Lotha Baptist Church
 Mary Help of Christians Cathedral, Kohima

Sports in Kohima 
Sport in Kohima
 Football in Kohima
 Kohima Komets
 Sort venues in Kohima
 Indira Gandhi Stadium

Economy and infrastructure of Kohima 

 Banking in Kohima

 Commerce in Kohima
 Markets in Kohima

 Communications in Kohima
 Media in Kohima
 Newspapers in Kohima 
 Capi

Transportation in Kohima 
Transport in Kohima
 Air transport in Kohima
 Kohima Chiethu Airport
 Rail transit in Kohima
 Kohima Zubza Railway Station

Education in Kohima 

Education in Kohima

 Educational Institutions in Kohima
 Universities in Kohima
 Nagaland University, Meriema Campus

Health in Kohima 

 Hospitals in Kohima
 Naga Hospital Authority
 Nagaland Medical College

See also 
 Nagaland
 Index of Kohima-related articles
 Outline of geography

References

External links 

Kohima
 1